Deh Shad-e Bala (also Romanized as Deh Shād-e Bālā; also known as Deh Shāh-e Bālā, Deh Shāh, and Deh Shāhī Bālā) is a village in Razakan Rural District, in the Central District of Shahriar County, Tehran Province, Iran. At the 2006 census, its population was 3,065, in 760 families.

References 

Populated places in Shahriar County